Italy competed at the 2011 Summer Universiade in Shenzhen, China, and won 30 medals.

Medals

Details

References

External links
 Universiade (World University Games)
 WORLD STUDENT GAMES (UNIVERSIADE - MEN)
 WORLD STUDENT GAMES (UNIVERSIADE - WOMEN)

Summer U
2011
Nations at the 2011 Summer Universiade